Retainer may refer to:
 Retainer (orthodontics), devices for teeth
 RFA Retainer (A329), a ship
 Retainers in early China, a social group in early China

Employment
 Retainer agreement, a contract in which an employer pays in advance for work, to be secured or specified later, when required
 Domestic worker or servant, especially one who has been with one family for a long time (chiefly British English)
 Affinity (medieval), also Retinue, a person or group gathered around in the service of a lord

See also
 RETAIN, a mainframe-based database system
 Retainer sacrifice, the sacrifice of a human servant
 Retainer medicine, a relationship between a patient and a primary care physician in which the patient pays an annual fee or retainer
 Retention (disambiguation)